Naked Beggars are an American glam metal band featuring former Cinderella bassist Eric Brittingham. The band was founded in 1998 by Brittingham's wife Inga along with Kris Casamento. Drummer Lisa Rav joined the group in September 2006; Dustin Carpenter has been the band's drummer since 2008. Naked Beggars have released two albums thus far: a self-titled debut in 2003, and the follow-up Spit It Out in 2005.

In April 2007, Jeff LaBar and his wife parted ways with Naked Beggars. LaBar died on July 14, 2021.

References

External links
Naked Beggars MySpace page

1998 establishments in Tennessee
Glam metal musical groups from Tennessee
Musical groups established in 1998
Musical groups from Nashville, Tennessee